Senator Boyle may refer to:

James Boyle (Maine politician) (born 1958), Maine State Senate
John Boyle (Northern Ireland politician) (1870/1871–1950), Northern Irish Senate
Phil Boyle (born 1961), New York State Senate